The 1929 Duke Blue Devils football team was an American football team that represented Duke University as a member of the Southern Conference during the 1929 college football season. In its fourth season under head coach James DeHart, the team compiled a 4–6 record (2–1 against conference opponents) and was outscored by a total of 260 to 153. Henry Kistler was the team captain.

Home games were played at the new Duke Stadium, on its campus in Durham, North Carolina.

Schedule

References

Duke
Duke Blue Devils football seasons
Duke Blue Devils football